The Kansas Jayhawks softball team represents the University of Kansas in NCAA Division I college softball.  The team participates in the Big 12 Conference. The Jayhawks are currently led by head coach Jennifer McFalls. The team plays its home games at Arrocha Ballpark at Rock Chalk Park located on the university's campus.

History

Coaching history

Championships

Conference Championships

Conference Tournament Championships

Coaching staff

Notable players
Sources:

Conference awards
Big 12 Player of the Year
Serena Settlemier, 2006
Kassie Humphries, 2003-2007 
Big 12 Freshman of the Year
Kara Pierce, 2001
Daniella Chavez, 2015

Big 12 Scholar-Athlete of the Year
Maggie Hull, 2013
Alex Jones, 2014
Maddie Stein, 2015

References